Pablo Durán Fernández (born 25 May 2001) is a Spanish professional footballer who plays as a winger for Celta de Vigo B.

Club career
Born in Tomiño, Pontevedra, Galicia, Durán is a youth product of his hometown club AD Tomiño. In 2020, after finishing his formation, he was offered to four Preferente de Galicia clubs, which turned him down, before joining Porriño Industrial FC initially on a trial period; he subsequently signed for the club and scored nine goals in ten appearances during the 2020–21 season.

On 5 July 2021, Durán moved straight to Segunda División RFEF after signing a two-year contract with SD Compostela. He was regularly used at Compos during the campaign, scoring eight goals in 32 matches and being named their player of the season.

On 8 August 2022, Compostela announced the transfer of Durán to La Liga side RC Celta de Vigo; he signed a five-year contract with the club the following day, and was initially assigned to the reserves in Primera Federación. He made his first team – and La Liga – debut on 29 October, coming on as a late substitute for Javi Galán in a 3–1 away loss to UD Almería.

References

External links
 
 
 

2001 births
Living people
Sportspeople from the Province of Pontevedra
Spanish footballers
Association football wingers
La Liga players
Primera Federación players
Segunda Federación players
Divisiones Regionales de Fútbol players
SD Compostela footballers
Celta de Vigo B players
RC Celta de Vigo players